David Vadimovich Gigolayev (born 31 March 1989) is a Russian football goalkeeper.

Club career
He made his debut in the Russian Football National League for FC Alania Vladikavkaz on 24 June 2011 in a game against FC Mordovia Saransk.

Career statistics

References

External links
 
 

1989 births
Sportspeople from Vladikavkaz
Living people
Russian footballers
Association football goalkeepers
FC Spartak Vladikavkaz players
FC Krymteplytsia Molodizhne players
FC Druzhba Maykop players
FC Mashuk-KMV Pyatigorsk players
Russian First League players
Russian Second League players
Crimean Premier League players